Henry Frank Barley (2 January 1905 – 1958) was an English professional footballer who played as a winger.

References

1905 births
1958 deaths
Footballers from Grimsby
English footballers
Association football wingers
Humber United F.C. players
Grimsby Town F.C. players
Hull City A.F.C. players
New Brighton Tower F.C. players
Notts County F.C. players
Scunthorpe United F.C. players
Bristol Rovers F.C. players
Barrow A.F.C. players
Kidderminster Harriers F.C. players
Frickley Athletic F.C. players
English Football League players